Gopriphis is a genus of mites in the family Laelapidae.

Species
 Gopriphis pterophilus (Berlese, 1882)

References

Laelapidae